Thomas Frigård (born 5 November 1972) is a Norwegian former football midfielder.

Hailing from Vormsund, he is a younger brother of Geir Frigård. He played youth football for Fu/Vo and Lillestrøm SK. After his first senior season he continued his career in Eidsvold TF. From 1994 to 1997 he played 66 league games and scored eight goals for Stabæk. Seven of the goals came in the 1994 1. divisjon, one goal in the Eliteserien. In 1997 he played only six minutes of league football, two cup games and two games in the 1997 UEFA Intertoto Cup, scoring against K.R.C. Genk. He joined IK Start post-season.

After a year in Start he joined FC Kärnten (then called Austria Klagenfurt) in January 1999. He scored three goals in 27 appearances (21 starts) in the 1999–00 Austrian second tier. After one and a half seasons there he played two seasons for SV Spittal and two for SVG Bleiburg. In 2004 he played for Ullensaker/Kisa IL, and from 2005 through 2008 for Eidsvold TF while also working as a journalist in Raumnes. Gaining a reputation as a muckraker journalist, in 2018 he was hired by Kommunal Rapport.

References

1972 births
Living people
Norwegian footballers
People from Nes, Akershus
Eidsvold TF players
Stabæk Fotball players
IK Start players
FC Kärnten players
SV Spittal players
SVG Bleiburg players
Ullensaker/Kisa IL players
Eliteserien players
Norwegian First Division players
2. Liga (Austria) players
Association football midfielders
Norwegian expatriate footballers
Expatriate footballers in Austria
Norwegian expatriate sportspeople in Austria
Norwegian journalists